was a Japanese enka singer, lyricist and composer. His band Shiro Miya and the Pinkara Trio's 1972 song "Onna no Michi", became the second best-selling single in Japanese Oricon charts history, selling over 3.25 million copies.

Life and career 
Miya in Kasai, Hyogo Prefecture. In 1959 while working in a cabaret in Himeji he independently produced "Otoko no Kado". In 1961, he started the comic band Suparō Boys. In 1963, he formed the comic band Pinkara Trio together with his elder brother Gorō Miya and Hiroshi Namiki.

In 1972, their debut song under the Nippon Columbia, "Onna no Michi", sold about 4 million copies, following that "Onna no Negai" and "Onna no Yume" also reached million copies in sales each.

In 1973 Hiroshi Namaki left Pinkara Trio, the band name became Pinkara Kyōdai (meaning pin kara brothers). In the same year, he sang "Onna no Michi" in NHK's year-end show Kōhaku Uta Gassen for the first time.

In 1983 Pinkara Kyōdai broke up and he began singing on his own. Gorō Miya died in 1994 and Hiroshi Namiki died in 1998.

In 2004 he appeared dressed up as an insect in a commercial and sang "Mushi Gokoro". In 2005, he also appeared in another commercial and sang "Odekake Bojō". In 2007, he performed "Onna no Michi" in the 5th story of movie Kayōkyoku dayo Jinsei wa.

On 18 March 2009 he released single "Onna no Michi: Part 2". The single peaked at No. 106 and charted for two weeks on Japanese Oricon charts.

References

External links 

 Official Website 
 Columbia Music Entertainment profile 
 
 Shiro Miya's obituary 

1943 births
2012 deaths
20th-century Japanese composers
21st-century Japanese composers
Enka singers
Japanese lyricists
Japanese male composers
Japanese male singer-songwriters
Japanese singer-songwriters
Musicians from Hyōgo Prefecture
20th-century Japanese male singers
20th-century Japanese singers
21st-century Japanese male singers
21st-century Japanese singers